John McEnroe was the defending champion, but lost in the third round this year.

Boris Becker won the title, defeating Stefan Edberg 6–4, 3–6, 6–3 in the final.

Seeds

Draw

Finals

Top half

Section 1

Section 2

Section 3

Section 4

External links
 Main draw

1986 Grand Prix (tennis)